Lac-Sergent is a village situated alongshore Sergent Lake in Portneuf Regional County Municipality in the Canadian province of Quebec.

Demographics 

Population trend:
 Population in 2021: 541 (2016 to 2021 population change: 8.9%)
 Population in 2016: 497 
 Population in 2011: 466 
 Population in 2006: 423
 Population in 2001: 239
 Population in 1996: 198
 Population in 1991: 219

Mother tongue:
 English as first language: 2.4%
 French as first language: 97.6%
 English and French as first language: 0%
 Other as first language: 0%

List of mayors
 Charles-Eugène Côté (1921-1923)
 Fortunat Gingras (1923-1935)
 J.-Émilius Garon (1935-1937)
 Célestin Côté (1937-1938)
 Robert Côté (1938-1940)
 Lucien Plamondon (1940-1945)
 Germain Gastonguay (1945-1946)
 A.-Frédéric Mercier (1946-1948)
 J.-Arthur Verrault (1948-1954)
 Émile Dion (1954-1957)
 J.-François Pinet (1957-1960)
 H.-Paul Cantin (1960-1969)
 Zéphirin A. Paquet (1969-1981)
 François Desrochers (1981-1985)
 Laurent Langlois (1985-1993)
 Yvan Pacaud (1993-1997)
 Jacques Pinet (1997-2000)
 Guy Beaudoin (2000-2005)
 Denis Racine (2005-2016)

References

External links

 Lac-Sergent Boat Club Association
 APPELS - Lac-Sergent Environment Protection Association
 Portneuf RCM

Cities and towns in Quebec
Incorporated places in Capitale-Nationale